Bat mastadenovirus A, formerly Bat adenovirus TJM, is a species of the genus Mastadenovirus of the family Adenoviridae. It is a double stranded DNA virus with no RNA sequence. The designation TJM refers to the strain as there are several species of Bat adenoviruses in three groups 1, 2, and 3.

Virology 
Bat mastadenovirus A is most closely related to Tree shrew mastadenovirus A and Canine mastadenovirus A. Its genome consists of 30 putative genes exhibiting wide genetic diversity among bat species and within the same species harboring AdVs.

Reservoir 
Bat mastadenovirus A was first isolated from Myotis and Scotophilus kuhlii bats in Beijing, Hunan, Jiangxi, Yunnan, Guizhou and Hainan provinces in China in 2007 and 2008.

Transmission 
Transmission between same species is believed to be by droplet respiration and aerosolization of saliva, urine, and feces in closed environments such as caves and other bat roosts. Genomic analysis suggests canine adenoviruses may have originated from bites by vespertilionid bats.

See also 
 Adenovirus genome

References

External links 
 Bat adenovirus TJM genome
 European Nucleotide Archive: Bat adenovirus TJM
 Stanford University - Adenoviruses
 3D macromolecular structures of Adenoviruses archived in the EM Data Bank(EMDB)
 Molecule of the Month: Adenovirus

Adenoviridae
Animal virology
Bat virome